Hairy may refer to:
 people or animals covered in hairs or fur
 plants covered in trichomes
 insects covered in setae
 people nicknamed "the Hairy"
 Hairy (gene)

See also 
 Hairies, a fictional people
 Haerye, a Korean text
 Hary (disambiguation)